International relations between the Republic of Chile and the Argentine Republic have existed for decades. Although both countries gained their independence during the South American wars of liberation, during much of the 19th and the 20th century, relations between the countries were chilly as a result of disputes over the border in Patagonia. Despite this, Chile and Argentina have never been engaged in a war with each other. In recent years, relations have improved. Argentina and Chile have followed quite different economic policies. Chile has signed free trade agreements with countries such as China, the US, Canada, South Korea, and the EU, and is a member of the APEC, while Argentina belongs to the Mercosur regional free trade area. In April 2018, both countries suspended their membership from the UNASUR.

Historical relations (1550–1989)

Rule under Spain and Independence

The relationship between the two countries can be traced back to an alliance during Spanish colonial times. Both colonies were offshoots of the Viceroyalty of Peru, with the Viceroyalty of the Río de la Plata (which Argentina was a part of) being broken off in 1776, and Chile not being broken off until independence. Argentina and Chile were colonized by different processes. Chile was conquered as a southward extension of the original conquest of Peru, while Argentina was colonized from Peru, Chile and from the Atlantic.

Argentina and Chile were close allies during the wars of independence from the Spanish Empire. Chile, like most of the revolting colonies, was defeated at a point by Spanish armies, while Argentina remained independent throughout its war of independence. After the Chilean defeat in the Disaster of Rancagua, the remnants of the Chilean Army led by Bernardo O'Higgins took refuge in Mendoza. Argentine General José de San Martín, by that time governor of the region, included the Chilean exiles in the Army of the Andes, and in 1817 led the crossing of the Andes, defeated the Spaniards, and confirmed the Chilean Independence. While he was in Santiago, Chile a cabildo abierto (open town hall meeting) offered San Martín the governorship of Chile, which he declined, in order to continue the liberating campaign in Peru.

In 1817 Chile began the buildup of its Navy in order to carry the war to the Viceroyalty of Perú. Chile and Argentina signed a treaty in order to finance the enterprise. But Argentina, fallen in a civil war, was unable to contribute. The naval fleet, after being built, launched a sea campaign to fight the Spanish fleet in the Pacific to liberate Peru. After a successful land and sea campaign, San Martín proclaimed the Independence of Peru in 1821.

War against the Peru–Bolivian Confederation

From 1836 to 1839, Chile and Argentina united in a war against the confederation of Peru and Bolivia. The underlying cause was the apprehension of Chile and Argentina against potential power of Peru-Bolivia block.  This resulted from concern over the large territory of Peru-Bolivia as well as the perceived threat that such a rich state would represent to their southern neighbors. Chile declared the war on 11 November 1836 and Argentina on 19 May 1837.

In 1837 Felipe Braun, one of Santa Cruz's most capable generals and highly decorated veteran of the war of independence, defeated an Argentine army sent to topple Santa Cruz. On 12 November 1838 Argentine representatives signed an agreement with the Bolivian troops. However, on 20 January 1839 the Chilean force obtained a decisive victory against Peru-Bolivia at the Battle of Yungay and the short-lived Peru-Bolivian Confederation came to an end.

Chincha's war

A series of coastal and high-seas naval battles between Spain and its former colonies of Peru and Chile occurred between 1864 and 1866.  These actions began with Spain's seizure of the guano-rich Chincha Islands, part of a strategy by Isabel II of Spain to reassert her country's lost influence in Spain's former South American empire.  These actions prompted an alliance between Ecuador, Bolivia, Peru and Chile against Spain. As a result, all Pacific coast ports of South America situated south of Colombia were closed to the Spanish fleet. Argentina, however, refused to join the alliance and maintained amicable relations with Spain and delivered coal to the Spanish fleet.

War of the Pacific
On 6 February 1873, Peru and Bolivia signed a secret treaty of alliance against Chile. On 24 September, Argentine president Domingo Faustino Sarmiento asked the Argentine Chamber of Deputies to join Argentina with the alliance. The Argentine chamber assented by a vote of 48–18. The treaty made available a credit of six million pesos for military expenditures. However, in 1874, after the delivery of the Chilean ironclad Almirante Cochrane and the ironclad Blanco Encalada, the Argentine Senate postponed the matter until late 1874, and Sarmiento was prevented signing the treaty. Consequently, Argentina remained neutral during the war; and the Argentinians signed a Border Treaty with Chile in 1881.

Claims on Patagonia

Border disputes continued between Chile and Argentina, as Patagonia was then a largely unexplored area. The Border Treaty of 1881 established the line of highest mountains dividing the Atlantic and Pacific watersheds as the border between Argentina and Chile. This principle was easily applied in northern Andean border region; but in Patagonia drainage basins crossed the Andes.  This led to further disputes over whether the Andean peaks would constitute the frontier (favoring Argentina) or the drainage basins (favoring Chile). Argentina argued that previous documents referring to the boundary always mentioned the Snowy Cordillera as the frontier and not the continental divide. The Argentine explorer Francisco Perito Moreno suggested that many Patagonian lakes draining to the Pacific were in fact part of the Atlantic basin but had been moraine-dammed during the quaternary glaciations changing their outlets to the west. In 1902, war was again avoided when British King Edward VII agreed to mediate between the two nations. He cleverly established the current Argentina-Chile border in Patagonia by dividing many disputed lakes into two equal parts. Several of these lakes still have different names on each side of the frontier, such as the lake known in Chile as Lago O'Higgins and in Argentina as Lago San Martín. A dispute that arose in the northern Puna de Atacama was resolved with the Puna de Atacama Lawsuit of 1899.

Arms race and foreign policy cooperation

Dreadnought race

At the start of the 1900s a naval arms race began amongst the most powerful and wealthy countries in South America: Argentina, Brazil and Chile. It began when the Brazilian government ordered three formidable battleships whose capabilities far outstripped older vessels after the Brazilian Navy found itself well behind the Argentine and Chilean navies in quality and total tonnage.

Baltimore Crisis

During the Baltimore Crisis which brought Chile and the United States to the brink of war in 1891 (at the end of the 1891 Chilean Civil War), the Argentine foreign minister Estanislao Zeballos offered the US-minister in Buenos Aires the Argentine province of Salta as base of operations from which to attack Chile overland. In return, Argentina asked the U.S. for the cession of southern Chile to Argentina. Later, Chile and the United States averted the war.

Pactos de Mayo

The Pactos de Mayo are four protocols signed in Santiago de Chile by Chile and Argentina on 28 May 1902 in order to extend their relations and resolve its territorial disputes. The disputes had led both countries to increase their military budgets and run an arms race in the 1890s. More significantly the two countries divided their influence in South America into two spheres: Argentina would not threaten Chile's Pacific Coast hegemony, and Santiago promised not to intrude east of the Andes.

Snipe incident

In 1958 the Argentine Navy shelled a Chilean lighthouse and disembarked infantry in the uninhabitable islet Snipe, at the east entrance of the Beagle Channel.

Killing of Hernán Merino Correa

The Laguna del Desierto incident, in Argentina called also Battle of Laguna del Desierto occurred between four members of Carabineros de Chile and 90 members of the Argentine Gendarmerie and took place in zone south of O'Higgins/San Martín Lake on 6 November 1965, resulting in one Lieutenant killed and a Sergeant injured, both members of Carabineros, creating a tense atmosphere between Chile and Argentina.

Operation Soberanía

Trouble once again began to brew in the 1960s, when Argentina began to claim that the Picton, Lennox and Nueva islands in the Beagle Channel were rightfully theirs, although this was in direct contradiction of the 1881 treaty, as the Beagle Channel Arbitration, and the initial Beagle Channel cartography since 1881 stated.

Both countries submitted the controversy to binding arbitration by the international tribunal. The decision (see Beagle Channel Arbitration between the Republic of Argentina and the Republic of Chile, Report and Decision of the Court of Arbitration) recognized all the islands to be Chilean territory.  Argentina unilaterally repudiated the decision of the tribunal and planned a war of aggression against Chile.

Direct negotiations between Chile and Argentina in 1977-78 failed and relations became extremely tense. Argentina sent troops to the border in Patagonia and in Chile large areas were mined. On 22 December, Argentina started Operation Soberanía in order to invade the islands and continental Chile, but after a few hours stopped the operation when Pope John Paul II sent a personal message to both presidents urging a peaceful solution. Both countries agreed that the Pope would mediate the dispute through the offices of Cardinal Antonio Samoré his special envoy (See Papal mediation in the Beagle conflict).

On 9 January 1979 the Act of Montevideo was signed in Uruguay pledging both sides to a peaceful solution and a return to the military situation of early 1977. The conflict was still latent during the Falklands War and was resolved only after the fall of the Argentine military junta.

A number of prominent public officials in Chile still point to past Argentine treaty repudiations when referring to relations between the two neighbors.

Falklands War

During the Falklands War in 1982, with the Beagle conflict still pending, Chile and Colombia were the only South American countries to abstain from voting in the TIAR.

The Argentine government planned to seize the disputed Beagle Channel islands after the occupation of the Falkland Islands. Basilio Lami Dozo the then Chief of the Argentine Air Force, disclosed that Leopoldo Galtieri told him that:
"[Chile] have to know what we are doing now, because they will be the next in turn.
Óscar Camilión, the last Argentine Foreign Minister before the war (29 March 1981 to 11 December 1981) has stated that:
"The military planning was, after the solution of the Falklands case, to invade the disputed islands in the Beagle. That was the determination of the Argentine Navy."
These preparations were public. On 2 June 1982 the newspaper La Prensa published an article by Manfred Schönfeld explaining what would follow Argentina's expected victory in the Falkland Islands:
"The war will not be finished for us, because after the defeat of our enemies in the Falklands, they must be blown away from South Georgia, the South Sandwich Islands, and all Argentine Austral archipelagos."
Argentine General Osiris Villegas demanded (in April 1982) after the successful Argentine landing in the Falklands that his government stop negotiations with Chile and seize the islands south of the Beagle. In his book La propuesta pontificia y el espacio nacional comprometido, (p. 2), he asked:
no persistir en una diplomacia bilateral que durante años la ha inhibido para efectuar actos de posesión efectiva en las islas en litigio que son los hechos reales que garantizan el establecimiento de una soberanía usurpada y la preservación de la integridad del territorio nacional.
This intention was probably known to the Chilean government, as the Chileans provided the United Kingdom with 'limited, but significant information' during the conflict. The Chilean Connection is described in detail by Sir Lawrence Freedman in his book The Official History of the Falklands Campaign.

Post-Pinochet democratic governments in Chile have given greater support to the Argentine claim on the Falkland Islands.

In June 2010 (as in 2009 and years before) Chile has supported the Argentine position at the United Nations Special Committee on Decolonization calling for direct negotiations between Argentina and the United Kingdom concerning the Falkland Islands dispute.

Peace and Friendship Treaty

This important treaty was an agreement signed in 1984 between Argentina and Chile establishing friendly relations between the two countries. Particularly, the treaty defines the border delineation and freedom of navigation in the Strait of Magellan and gives possession of the Picton, Lennox and Nueva islands and sea located south of Tierra del Fuego to Chile, but the most part of the Exclusive Economic Zone eastwards of the Cape Horn-Meridian to Argentina. After that, other border disputes were resolved by peaceful means.

The 1984 treaty was succeeded by the Maipu Treaty of Integration and Cooperation (Tratado de Maipú de Integración y Cooperación) signed on 30 October 2009

Post-1990 relations

Argentine support for Bolivia
Despite the Pactos de Mayo agreement, in 2004 Argentina proposed to establish a "corridor" through Chilean territory under partial Argentine administration as a Bolivian outlet to sea. After talks with Chilean ambassador to Argentina, the Kirchner government pulled out of the proposal and declared the issue as "concerning Chile and Bolivia" only.

Border issues

In the 1990s, relations improved dramatically. The dictator and last president of the Argentine Military Junta, General Reynaldo Bignone, called for democratic elections in 1983, and Augusto Pinochet of Chile did the same in 1989. As a consequence, militaristic tendencies faded in Argentina. The Argentine presidents Carlos Menem and Fernando de la Rúa had particularly good relations with Chile. In a bilateral manner, both countries settled all the remaining disputes except Laguna del Desierto, which was decided by International Arbitration in 1994. That decision favoured Argentine claims.

According to a 1998 negotiation held in Buenos Aires, a  section of the boundary in the Southern Patagonian Ice Field is still pending mapping and demarcation according to the limits already settled by the 1881 treaty. In 2006, president Néstor Kirchner invited Chile to define the border, but Michelle Bachelet's government left the invitation unanswered. The same year, the Chilean government sent a note to Argentina complaining that Argentine tourism maps showed a normal boundary in the Southern Patagonian Icefield placing most of the area in Argentina.

Officially Chile supports the Argentine claim on the Falkland Islands, despite supporting the United Kingdom during the 1982 Argentine invasion of the Islands.

Geopolitics over Antarctica and the control of the passages between the south Atlantic and the south Pacific have led to the founding of cities and towns such as Ushuaia and Puerto Williams, both of which claim to be the southernmost cities in world.
Currently, both countries have research stations in Antarctica, as does the United Kingdom. All three nations claim the totality of the Antarctic Peninsula.

Economy and energy
Trade between the two countries is made mostly over the mountain passes that have enough infrastructure for large scale trade.
The trade balance shows a great deal of asymmetry. , Chile is the third export trading partner for Argentina, behind Brazil and the United States. Significant import products from Argentina to Chile include cereal grains and meat. Recently, significant Chilean capital has been invested in Argentina, especially in the retail market sector.

In 1996, Chile became an associate member of Mercosur, a regional trade agreement that Argentina and Brazil created in the 1990s. This associate membership does not convey full membership to Chile, however. In 2009, approvals were granted for a $3-billion Pascua Lama project to mine an ore body on the border of the two countries. In 2016, Argentina's exports to Chile amounted to US$2.3 billion, while Chile's exports to Argentina amounted to US$689.5 million.

Gas
Argentine president Carlos Menem signed a natural gas exportation treaty with Chilean president Eduardo Frei Ruiz-Tagle in 1996. In 2005, President Néstor Kirchner broke the treaty due to a supply shortage experienced by Argentina. The situation in Argentina was partly resolved when Argentina increased its own imports from Bolivia, a country with no diplomatic relations with Chile since 1978. In the import contract signed with Bolivia it was specified that not even a drop of Bolivian gas could be sold to Chile from Argentina.

Sports
In 2003, Argentine AFA's president suggested that both countries launch a joint bid for the 2014 FIFA World Cup but was abandoned in favor of a CONMEBOL unified posture to allow the tournament be hosted in Brazil.

Beginning in 2009, the Dakar Rally began to be held in South America, and both Argentina and Chile have collaborated in organizing the annual cross-border event multiple times.

Host country Chile and Argentina contested the 2015 Copa America final and Chile was declared Champion after penalty shots. Copa America 2016 trophy was also for Chile against Argentina once again in the penalty shots.

Technology
Argentina announced on 28 August 2009 the election of the Japanese/Brazilian ISDB-T digital television standard with Chile following the same direction on 14 September.

Military integration

Since the 1990s, both militaries began a close defense cooperation and friendship policy. In September 1991 they signed together with Brazil, the Mendoza Declaration, which commits signatories not to use, develop, produce, acquire, stock, or transfer —directly or indirectly— chemical or biological weapons.

Joint exercises were established on an annual basis in the three armed forces alternately in Argentina and Chile territory. An example of such maneuvers is the Patrulla Antártica Naval Combinada performed by both Navies to guarantee safety to all touristic and scientific ships that are in transit within the Antarctic Peninsula.

Both nations are highly involved in UN peacekeeping missions. UNFICYP in Cyprus was a precedent where Chilean troops are embedded in the Argentine contingent. They played a key role together at MINUSTAH in Haiti(Video Haiti) and in 2005 they began the formation of a joint force for future United Nations mandates. Named Cruz del Sur, the new force began assembly in 2008 with headquarters alternately on each country every year.

In 2005, while the Argentine Navy school ship ARA Libertad was under overhaul, Argentine cadets were invited to complete their graduation on the Chilean Navy school ship Esmeralda and in another gesture of confidence, on 24 June 2007, a Gendarmeria Nacional Argentina (Border Guard) patrol was given permission to enter Chile to rescue tourists after their bus became trapped in snow.

Chilean earthquake

On 13 March 2010, following the Chilean earthquake the benefit concert Argentina Abraza Chile was hosted in Buenos Aires, and an Argentine Air Force Mobile Field Hospital was deployed to Curicó.

On 8 April 2010 the newly elected Chilean president Sebastián Piñera made his first trip abroad a visit to Buenos Aires where he thanked president Cristina Fernández for the help received. He also stated his commitment to an increased cooperation between the two countries.

Argentina protects fugitive of Chilean justice
In September 2010, CONARE (the Argentine National Refugee Commission, a department of the Argentine Interior Ministry) granted asylum to Chilean citizen Galvarino Apablaza.  Apablaza now lives in Argentina where he is married to journalist Paula Chain, and is father to three Argentine-born children. Chain has worked for the Argentine Government press office since 2009. Apablaza is accused by Chile of being involved in the murder of Chilean Senator Jaime Guzmán in 1991, during the government of Patricio Aylwin, as well as the kidnapping of the son of one of the owners of the El Mercurio newspaper. The asylum status has been universally rejected by the Chilean government, as well as by the Argentine political opposition. Some Argentine media and journalists have pointed out that the Argentine government ignored a ruling of the Argentine Supreme Court of Justice allowing the extradition of Apablaza. Chilean state attorney Gustavo Gené has pointed out that there was no question of the Chilean legal system's authority or grounds by the Argentine Commission, and that the reasons for granting political asylum were based exclusively on "humanitarian grounds".

The Argentine decree 256/2010 about the Strait of Magellan

On 17 February 2010 the Argentine executive issued the decree 256/2010 pertaining to authorisation requirements placed on shipping to and from Argentina but also to ships going through Argentine jurisdictional water heading for ports in the Falkland Islands, South Georgia and South Sandwich Islands. This decree was implemented by disposition 14/2010 of the Prefectura Naval Argentina. On 19 May 2010 the United Kingdom presented a note verbale rejecting the Argentine government's decrees and stipulating that the UK considered the decrees "are not compliant with International Law including the UN Convention on the Law of the Sea ”, and with respect to the Straits of Magellan the note recalls that "the rights of international shipping to navigate these waters expeditiously and without obstacle are affirmed in the 1984 Treaty of Peace and Friendship between Chile and Argentina with respect to the Straits of Magellan".

Article 10 of the 1984 Treaty states "The Argentine Republic undertakes to maintain, at any time and in whatever circumstances, the right of ships of all flags to navigate expeditiously and without obstacles through its jurisdictional waters to and from the Strait of Magellan".

See also
Laguna del Desierto incident
Southern Patagonian Ice Field dispute
Beagle conflict
Puna de Atacama dispute
 ABC countries
 Foreign relations of Argentina
 Foreign relations of Chile
 List of ambassadors of Argentina to Chile

References

Sources
  Historia de las Relaciones Exteriores Argentinas  by Carlos Escudé and Andrés Cisneros
  Combined Military Force Cruz del Sur - official press release

External links
  Official website of the Argentine Ministry of Foreign Relations, International Trade and Worship
  Official website of the Chilean Ministry of Foreign Relations
 Research Project on the History of the Relations between Argentina and Chile, 1978-2000

 
Chile
Bilateral relations of Chile